Olgivanna Lloyd Wright (born Olga Ivanovna Lazović; December 27, 1898 – March 1, 1985) was the third and final wife of architect Frank Lloyd Wright. They met in November 1924 and married in 1928. In 1932 the couple founded Wright's architectural apprentice program and the Taliesin Fellowship. In 1940, Olgivanna and Frank founded the Frank Lloyd Wright Foundation with their son-in-law, William Wesley "Wes" Peters. Olgivanna became the President of the Frank Lloyd Wright Foundation upon her husband's death in 1959. She remained the president until a month before her death in 1985.

Early life
Olga Ivanovna (Olgivanna) Lazović was born in Montenegro on December 27, 1898, to Jovan Lazović, Montenegro's first Chief Justice, and Milica Miljanov. Milica was the daughter of the famous Montenegrin writer, duke, and leader of the Kuči tribe, Marko Miljanov, who had risen to the rank of general in the Montenegrin army. Olgivanna was the youngest of five children (with two brothers and two sisters). After her father became blind, he had Olgivanna read him court documents.

When Olgivanna was nine-years-old, her older sister Julia brought Olgivanna to live with her and her husband, Constantin Siberakov, in Russia.

Career
In Russia, Olgivanna met Vladimar Hinzenberg. They were married in 1917 when Olgivanna was 19.

After the birth of a daughter in 1917, Olgivanna met and became a devotee of G. I. Gurdjieff. She left her husband and child to follow Gurdjieff and his group to France at the Prieuré des Basses Loges in what was known as Gurdjieff's Institute for the Harmonious Development of Man. Olgivanna spent roughly seven years working under Gurdjieff. She began her career with Gurdjieff as a student of sacred dance, which she later taught to students of her own, including Diana Huebert.  In 1923, while in France, Olgivanna nursed Katherine Mansfield on her deathbed.

In August 1924, Gurdjieff suffered a car accident, disbanded the group, and encouraged Olgivanna to go to the United States to save her marriage (she and Vladimar had not lived together for years, and their daughter was in New Jersey at her brother's home).  After a short while, Olgivanna felt that her marriage to Vladimar was over, so she went to Chicago. There, she persuaded her friends to allow her to teach their children the sacred dance (or "Movements", as they were known).  While in Chicago, in late November 1924, she attended a Saturday matinee of dancer Tamara Karsavina, where she met Frank Lloyd Wright. The two sat in the box seat and began talking. According to architectural writer Walt Lockley, "The Foundation and the Fellowship would not exist in any form if Wright had not gone to the [ballet] with a friend one Sunday afternoon in 1924 Chicago and sat near to the dark-haired Montenegrin dancer." Wright wrote about this chance meeting in the 1943 edition of his autobiography:In a sentence or two she criticized Karsavina from our point of view, showing unusual familiarity with dancing and dancers. No longer quite so strange, the emissary of Fate, mercy on my soul, from the other side of the known world, bowed her head to my invitation to tea at the nearby Congress. She accepted with perfect ease without artificial hesitation.

I was in love with her.

It was as simple as that.

The two quickly initiated a romantic relationship. Embroiled in scandal and controversy from the beginning of their relationship (since both were married at its start), she and her daughter came to live at Wright's Wisconsin home, Taliesin. By February 1925, Olgivanna was pregnant with their daughter, Iovanna. In April 1925, a major fire due to electrical problems destroyed Taliesin's living quarters.  The end of 1925 also brought problems for the two as Wright's estranged second wife began a vindictive campaign to deny Wright the ability to divorce her, which he could not do until 1927 (Olgivanna and her first husband had divorced years before).  In October 1926, Olgivanna and Wright were accused of violating the Mann Act and arrested in Tonka Bay, Minnesota, but the charges were later dropped. Wright and Olgivanna married on August 25, 1928, in Rancho Santa Fe, California, and honeymooned in Phoenix, Arizona.

The Taliesin Fellowship
In 1932, the two initiated the Taliesin Fellowship, an architectural apprentice program. Former apprentice Edgar Tafel described Olgivanna's influence on the Taliesin Fellowship in his book, Apprentice to Genius: Years With Frank Lloyd Wright. Tafel wrote that, "His [Wright's] marriage to Olgivanna was a tremendous stabilizing element for him - her devotion and strength brought his genius forward again. She knew how to take care of him." Beyond Olgivanna's effect on Wright personally, Tafel (who was in the Fellowship from 1932 to 1941) wrote that her background with Gurdjieff had a positive effect on the organization of the Taliesin Fellowship, which regularly had dozens of men and women living with the Wrights at Taliesin in Wisconsin and his winter home, Taliesin West, in Arizona:This experience [with the Institute for the Harmonious Development of Man] gave her the background to organize the operation of Taliesin and to bring another dimension to the life of the Fellowship. In this way, her experience with Gurdjieff did influence the form of the Fellowship and some of the activities envisioned from the beginning. Mrs. Wright was the force that kept the Fellowship in working order, from the very start. A remarkable woman.

In 1970, Olgivanna invited Svetlana Alliluyeva, the youngest child and only daughter of Joseph Stalin to Taliesin West, the winter compound of the Taliesin Fellowship. Alliluyeva and William Wesley "Wes" Peters married three weeks after they met. After having a daughter named Olga during a marriage that lasted 20 months, Alliluyeva came away with a less than glowing impression of the matriarch and her management of Taliesin:
This hierarchical system was appalling: the widow at the top, then the board of directors (a formality); then her own close inner circle, making all the real decisions; then working architects—the real working horses; at the bottom, students who paid high sums to be admitted, only to be sent the next day to work in the kitchen to peel potatoes ... Mrs. Wright's word was law. She had to be adored and worshipped and flattered as often as possible; flowers sent by mail and presented by hand she enjoyed and encouraged. She gave advice to the architects, guided a drama circle, a dance group and a choir, counselling on private lives and relationships, expecting everyone to make personal confessions to her. She was a "spiritual leader" and self-appointed minister, preaching on Sunday mornings on matters of God and man, when everyone was supposed to be in her large living room.

Olgivanna continued to run the Taliesin Fellowship after Wright's death on April 9, 1959, almost until her own death in Scottsdale, Arizona, on March 1, 1985. The last quarter-century of Wright's life (1935–59)—when he, Olgivanna and the Taliesin Fellowship spent their winters in Arizona building Taliesin West—were arguably his most productive, representing "more than half of [Wright's] building".

Legacy
Olgivanna planned the removal of Wright's body from its Wisconsin grave, which was then "cremated, mixed with her ashes and used in the walls of a memorial garden to be built on the grounds of their home at Taliesin West." Iovanna Lloyd Wright was Olgivanna's only child with Wright. Olgivanna's only other daughter, Svetlana Hinzenberg, adopted the surname Wright. Svetlana married one of Wright's apprentices, Fellowship member Wes Peters, when she turned 18 in 1935.

Bibliography

Books by Olgivanna Lloyd Wright
Olgivanna Lloyd Wright wrote a weekly newspaper column starting in the 1950s entitled, "Our House". The newspaper columns were published the Arizona Republic in Phoenix, Arizona and The Capital Times in Madison, Wisconsin. "Our House" was published as a book of the same name. In addition, she wrote four other books, published by Horizon Books in the 1960s with the last one, The Struggle Within published in 1971:
 The Shining Brow: Frank Lloyd Wright (1960)
 The Roots of Life (1963)
 Frank Lloyd Wright: His Life, His Work, His Words (1966)
 The Struggle Within (1971)

Books about Olgivanna and the Taliesin Fellowship
 The Faraway Music by Svetlana Allilueva (also known as Distant Music.) Edition: 1st. New Delhi: Lancer International, 1984.
 The Fellowship: The Untold Story of Frank Lloyd Wright and the Taliesin Fellowship by Roger Friedland and Harold Zellman, 2006, includes especially extensive and strong documentation on Olgivanna, her relationship with Wright, including "the strong influence the occultist Georgi Gurdjieff had on Wright and especially his wife Olgivanna"
 Frank Lloyd Wright: A Biography by Meryle Secrest, 1992. New York: HarperCollins.
 From Crna Cora to Taliesin Black Mountain to Shining Brow: The Life of Olgivanna Lloyd Wright, by Maxine Fawcett-Yeske and Bruce Brooks Pfeiffer. ODO Editions, 2017. 
 Reflections from the Shining Brow: My Years with Frank Lloyd Wright and Olgivanna Lazovich, by Kamal Amin.  Fithian Press. 2004.
 A Taliesin Legacy: The Architecture of Frank Lloyd Wright's Apprentices (Architecture Series) by Tobias S. Guggenheimer.  Wiley, 1995.  "[A]n encyclopedia study of the projects planned and/or built by these students, who eagerly embraced Wright's ethic of organic design." (Book Review)
 Taliesin Reflections: My Years Before, During and After Living with Frank Lloyd Wright by Earl Nisbet, 2006. (Book Review)

Videography
 Frank Lloyd Wright – A film by Ken Burns and Lynn Novick.  (1998). PBS Home Video, August 28, 2001 (153 minutes). .
 Partner to Genius: A Biography of Olgivanna Lloyd Wright. PBS Home Video, VHS, May 13, 1997.  .

References

1898 births
1985 deaths
Frank Lloyd Wright
American female dancers
American dancers
Montenegrin emigrants to the Russian Empire
Emigrants from the Russian Empire to France
French emigrants to the United States
Students of George Gurdjieff